Mejía is a canton in the province of Pichincha in northern Ecuador. It is named after  Ecuadorian political figure José Mejía Lequerica. The canton includes a volcano in the Central Cordillera of the Ecuadorian Andes called Rumiñahui. The seat of the canton is called Machachi.

Machachi is located to the south of the capital of Ecuador, Quito. It is a very beautiful city surrounded by the volcanos Atacazo, Corazon, Rumiñahui, Illinizas peaks, Viudita hill, Pasochoa, Sincholagua and is also owns part of the Cotopaxi volcano, a great active volcano which measures 5,897 m (19,347 ft) in altitude. The valley contains 8 volcanoes, the reasons why Alexander von Humboldt named the region Avenue of Volcanoes.

In the Panzaleo language, Machachi means "Great active land." Machachi is the cradle of many slopes, and the same ground is a perennial thermal and mineral water outcrop.  In the fertile valleys of San Pedro there are approximately 22 sources of chemicals which have invaluable theurapeutical properties.

Machachi has a similar temperature to Quito, fluctuating from 19°C (66°F) average high to 10°C (50°F) average low. These averages are for the whole year with the dry months being June, July and August.

See also 
 Cotopaxi National Park
 Illinizas Ecological Reserve
 Pasochoa Wildlife Refuge

References

Cantons of Pichincha Province